Dr. William George Wells AM (4 December 1939 – 4 February 2021) served as the Chief Scout Commissioner of Scouts Australia from 1992 to 1999, and as Chairman of the Australian Queen's Scout Association in 2008.

Wells played a very important role in the Asia-Pacific Scout Region and was responsible for organizing the 31st World Scout Conference in Melbourne in 1988.

In 2002, Wells was awarded the 294th Bronze Wolf, the only distinction of the World Organization of the Scout Movement, awarded by the World Scout Committee for exceptional services to world Scouting.

Wells died on 4 February 2021.

References

External links

Recipients of the Bronze Wolf Award
Scouting and Guiding in Australia
1939 births
2021 deaths